Wilfried Happio (born 22 September 1998) is a French athlete specialising in the 400 metres hurdles. Born by a Martinican mother and a father from Metropolitan France, he won gold medals at the 2017 European U20 and 2019 European U23 Championships.

His personal best in the event is 47.41 seconds set in Eugene Oregon in 2022.

Personal life 
In 2020, Happio is accused of assaulting triple jump athlete Janet Scott, with whom he had a brief romantic relationship. The commission considered, after its judgment, that the facts were "not sufficiently established", and said it was unable "to establish whether Mr. Happio assaulted Ms. Scott or whether he acted in self-defense. " 

In 2022, he is the subject of a complaint for acts of sexual assault dating back to 2021 which were allegedly committed against another athlete resident at INSEP, a specialist in triple jump. He is eventually taken into custody on December 20 as part of the investigation for "sexual assault".

International competitions

References

1998 births
Living people
French male hurdlers
World Athletics Championships athletes for France
Sportspeople from Hauts-de-Seine
French Athletics Championships winners
Athletes (track and field) at the 2020 Summer Olympics
Olympic athletes of France
21st-century French people
European Athletics Championships medalists